Robert ("Bob") Marcelonis (June 2, 1953 to March 30, 1995) was an American musician and artist, based in Philadelphia.

Marcelonis was known in the Philadelphia arts community as a songwriter, playwright and founder of several improvisational comedy groups.  Naturally gifted and raised in a religious family, Bob had composed Masses, Ave Maria's and commemorative pieces for the canonization of Saint John Neumann.  He sang in the choir of the Basilica of Saints Peter and Paul. As well as playing various instruments, composing and orchestrating, Bob had an incredible voice and a natural singing ability. He graduated from Temple University's School of Music in May 1975, as a music composition major.

He was interested in of all types of music and cultures, which would often influence his musical compositions.  Though classically trained, he participated in the folk festival every year. And as well as masses, wrote inane lyrics and silly songs, always happy to make people laugh or to laugh himself.

As is often the case with artists, Marcelonis had to find work outside of the arts in order to make ends meet. He became an accomplished computer systems analyst in a matter of months through self-study and was able to maintain a comfortable lifestyle through this work.

During the late-1970s and early-1980s Marcelonis wrote scores of songs and played the local coffeehouse circuit both as a solo act and with his band, Melisma.  He lived for several years during the late-1970s and early-1980s in Los Angeles where he worked with "The Groundlings" learning the craft of improvisational comedy.

His mother was diagnosed with cancer just as Bob was starting to break through in both his musical and comedic talents. He returned home to Germantown, in Philadelphia, to care for his mother until she died. He remained in the home where he grew up never returning to California.

Upon returning home to Philadelphia he soon started his own series of improv groups. Some of the descendants of these groups are still performing in Philadelphia and other areas, to this day. He was thought of by many as a "catalyst"; bringing creative people together and initiating the creative process in music, comedy and various artistic media. Bob wrote a lot of comedy and could find humor in all of life. Bob used to justify his wit with his famous phrase: "Didja laugh?? Well, then!!" Always, with a smile, a joke, a song — Bob was a man of many talents and a very simplistic, uncomplicated life view.

In the early-1990s, Bob's life would change drastically when he learned he was HIV positive. Bob fought hard for his life but came to accept his pending death as certain, as his illness would infiltrate his body and he would get AIDS, suffering greatly. At first he feared admitting his illness and losing his family and friends. But in the end, pure love overcame fear and as he told each of his family and friends, all embraced him and all were with him to the very end.

Bob used his illness as inspiration and motivation to complete his vision of two plays. One, Fables, based on Aesop's fables, was a continual work in progress from High School until he was forty. His artist friends came together and performed the play to standing room only audiences, sold out for its run.

Aids now had the upper hand on Bob but he had desire to complete one more play, Copernicus, an ironic twist since Nicolaus Copernicus the astronomer had leprosy, the AIDS of 15th century.

He wrote constantly, as he could feel himself getting weaker. It may be that his need to write the play, compose the music and the scores, is what got him through the ever darkening days of his health. His music's inspiration and aware of his time limitations, Bob made this not only a mission but his final work. Copernicus was a masterpiece of all his talents, music, composition, writing, comedy, love, life and death.

Bob paralleled the story to living with AIDS and used his play as a project for an AIDS fundraiser, "The Copernicus Project." Artists came from all over the world to mount this play. The hand sewn costumes were brilliant, a gift from Catherine Jansen, a well-respected mixed media artist shown in many galleries. Opera singers came from all over the globe to give Bob's play the best it could have. As he was writing the play his illness progressed. He lost vision in one eye and suffered terrible pain in his body. But love and passion kept his fire ever burning and he worked night and day on Copernicus, his gift to us, his love story.

He once said to a friend:
"I am sick with a deadly disease, I am weak and dying, this I know. But I also know that I am very blessed to be loved unconditionally, no matter what. And you know what? Right now, with my play being produced and all my friends and family here and to be so loved...even with AIDS, knowing I am dying, I wouldn't trade places with anyone at this moment!"

And he would not have. A man of great ability and the capacity to love and to be loved. He never had an agenda, just a passion for life, laughter and music.

Marcelonis died in his home in the Germantown section of Philadelphia in March 1995 after a prolonged struggle with AIDS.

1953 births
1995 deaths
20th-century American musicians
20th-century American male musicians